Yau Yat Tsuen is one of the 25 constituencies in the Sham Shui Po District of Hong Kong.

The constituency returns one district councillor to the Sham Shui Po District Council, with an election every four years. The seat is currently vacant. It was last held by Lawrence Lau, who defeated the then incumbent Dominic Lee Tsz-king of the Liberal Party (LP).

Derived from Tai Hang Tung & Yau Yat Tsuen in 2007, Yau Yat Tsuen constituency is loosely based on residential areas Tak Chee Yuen, Yau Yat Tsuen, Mount Beacon and the City University of Hong Kong in Kowloon Tong with estimated population of 14,650.

Councillors represented

Election results

2010s

2000s

References

Yau Yat Tsuen
Kowloon Tong
Constituencies of Hong Kong
Constituencies of Sham Shui Po District Council
2007 establishments in Hong Kong
Constituencies established in 2007